This is a list of airports in Malawi, sorted by location.



Airports 

Airport names shown in bold indicate the airport has scheduled service on commercial airlines.

See also 
 Transport in Malawi
 List of airports by ICAO code: F#FW – Malawi
 Wikipedia: WikiProject Aviation/Airline destination lists: Africa#Malawi

References 
 
  - includes IATA codes
 Great Circle Mapper: Airports in Malawi - IATA and ICAO codes
 World Aero Data: Malawi - ICAO codes

Malawi
 
Airports
Airports
Malawi